Sachs Harbour is a hamlet located in the Inuvik Region of the Northwest Territories, Canada. Situated on the southwestern coast of Banks Island in the Inuvialuit Settlement Region, the population according to the 2021 census count was 103 people. Sachs Harbour is the only permanent settlement on Banks Island.

Etymology 
The town was named after the ship Mary Sachs, which was part of the Canadian Arctic Expedition 1913–1916.

History 
Pre-Dorset cultural sites on the island have been found that date from approximately 1500 BCE. The pre-Dorset sites were later replaced by  archaeological cultures showing Eastern and Western Arctic Dorset characteristics in the southern parts of the island. From c. 800 BCE to 1000 CE, the northern half of Banks Island was seldom visited by people. From 1000 to 1450 Thule culture occupied several sites along the island, but due to the cooling climate brought on by the Little Ice Age, the island was most likely deserted until the arrival of the Inuvialuit in the 17th century.

The island on which Sachs Harbour is located was first spotted in 1820 by Sir William Edward Parry and named "Banks Land" in honour of Sir Joseph Banks. The origins of the settlement go back to 1929 when several Inuit families moved to the site to trap. It was incorporated as a hamlet in 1986.

On the north shore of Banks Island within Aulavik National Park is a narrow bay, Mercy Bay, penetrating some distance into the park. It is of historical significance for the Investigator, one of a number of ships sent out to the Arctic by the Admiralty to find the lost expedition of John Franklin. The Investigator, captained by Commander Robert McClure, became trapped in the ice in the bay for some three years and had to be abandoned by its crew. The Investigator sailed from England all around North and South America so that it passed through the Bering Strait in an attempt to find the Northwest Passage from the west while looking for Franklin's lost expedition.

Economy
The community's economy is based largely on hunting and trapping, but tourism also plays a small role. Most of the town lies within  of the shoreline. Residents engage in ice fishing, harvesting fish from the Amundsen Gulf and the Beaufort Sea. There is a goose hunt every spring. The community is also home to the largest commercial muskox harvests in Canada.

Aulavik National Park 
Sachs Harbour is the headquarters of Aulavik National Park and the Visitor Reception Centre is situated in Sachs Harbour. Aulavik National Park is located on the north end of Banks Island, and is co-operatively managed by Parks Canada with the residents of Sachs Harbour and the broader Inuvialuit community. The Visitor Reception Centre presents the park and Inuvialuit culture to visitors to Banks Island, as well as serves as a centre for community activities.

Demographics

The two principal languages in the town are Inuinnaqtun (Inuvialuktun) and English. Sachs Harbour is the only permanent settlement on Banks Island.

Infrastructure
Services include a two-member Royal Canadian Mounted Police detachment and a health centre with one nurse. Phone services are provided by Northwestel with Internet access. The local hunters and trappers association provides outfitting for big-game hunts like muskox and polar bears.

Geography

Climate 
Sachs Harbour is in the Arctic tundra climatic zone (ET), characterized by long, cold winters. Since the activities of many residents of the community revolve around fishing, hunting, and travel, many residents have considerable knowledge of weather conditions, permafrost, and even erosion patterns.

Flora and fauna 
Banks Island is home to the largest goose colony in North America. Three quarters of the world's population of muskoxen roam the island. Barren-ground caribou and polar bear are also seen on the island. On April 26, 2006, the world's first documented wild-born grizzly–polar bear hybrid was shot near the town.

Since the climate has been changing, sea ice has been breaking up earlier than normal, taking seals farther south in the summer. Seals are one of the main sources of food for the town. Sockeye and pink salmon appeared for the first time in nearby waters between 1999 and 2001. New species of birds are migrating to the island, including robins and barn swallows, and more flies and mosquitos have been appearing.

Gallery

See also
 List of municipalities in the Northwest Territories
 Thesiger Bay

References

External links 

 The White Fox Fur Trade NWT Historical Timeline, Prince of Wales Northern Heritage Centre

Communities in the Inuvik Region
Populated places in Arctic Canada
Hamlets in the Northwest Territories
Banks Island
Inuit in the Northwest Territories
Inuvialuit communities
Road-inaccessible communities of the Northwest Territories